Washington Township is one of the twelve townships of Jackson County, Ohio, United States.  As of the 2010 census, 782 people lived in the township.

Geography
Located in the northern part of the county, it borders the following townships:
Richland Township, Vinton County: north
Clinton Township, Vinton County: east
Milton Township: southeast
Coal Township: south
Jackson Township: west

A small part of the city of Wellston lies in far southeastern Washington Township, and the unincorporated community of Byer is located in the township's northwest.

Name and history
Washington Township was established around 1818, and named for George Washington, first President of the United States. It is one of forty-three Washington Townships statewide.

Government
The township is governed by a three-member board of trustees, who are elected in November of odd-numbered years to a four-year term beginning on the following January 1. Two are elected in the year after the presidential election and one is elected in the year before it. There is also an elected township fiscal officer, who serves a four-year term beginning on April 1 of the year after the election, which is held in November of the year before the presidential election. Vacancies in the fiscal officership or on the board of trustees are filled by the remaining trustees.

References

External links
County website

Townships in Jackson County, Ohio
Townships in Ohio